Stibara tricolor is a species of beetle in the family Cerambycidae. It was described by Johan Christian Fabricius in 1792, originally under the genus Saperda. It is known from Myanmar, India, China, Thailand, Malaysia, and Vietnam.

References

Saperdini
Beetles described in 1792